The 1909–10 Bucknell Bison men's basketball team represented Bucknell University during the 1909–10 NCAA men's basketball season. The head coach was George Hoskins, coaching the Bison in his second season.The Bison's team captain was N.I. Craig.

Schedule

|-

References

Bucknell Bison men's basketball seasons
Bucknell
Bucknell
Bucknell